Gamou is a village and rural commune in the Goure Department of the Zinder Region of Niger.

References

Communes of Niger
Zinder Region